Lin Sang (born August 17, 1977 in Putian, Fujian) is an archer from the People's Republic of China.

Lin represented China at the 2004 Summer Olympics.  She placed 11th in the women's individual ranking round with a 72-arrow score of 647.  In the first round of elimination, she faced 54th-ranked Tshering Chhoden of Bhutan.  In a major upset, Lin lost 159-156 in the 18-arrow match, placing only 36th overall in women's individual archery.

She also competed at the 1994 Asian Games winning a gold medal in the team event, at the 1998 Asian Games winning a silver medal in the team event and a bronze in the individual and at the 1999 World Archery Championships where she won a silver medal in the team event.

References

External links
 http://2004.sina.com.cn/star/lin_sang/index.shtml 
 http://2004.163.com/2004w07/12623/2004w07_1090669907331.html 

1977 births
Living people
Archers at the 2004 Summer Olympics
Chinese female archers
Olympic archers of China
Olympic silver medalists for China
People from Putian
Olympic medalists in archery
Asian Games medalists in archery
Sportspeople from Fujian
Archers at the 1994 Asian Games
Archers at the 1998 Asian Games
World Archery Championships medalists
Medalists at the 2004 Summer Olympics
Asian Games gold medalists for China
Asian Games silver medalists for China
Asian Games bronze medalists for China
Medalists at the 1994 Asian Games
Medalists at the 1998 Asian Games
20th-century Chinese women